Capital Punishment is the debut studio album by American rapper Big Pun, released by RCA Records, Loud Records and Fat Joe's Terror Squad Productions. Released on April 28, 1998, it is the only album released during his lifetime and was regarded as "super groundbreaking" upon release. The album peaked at number five on the Billboard 200 charts and number one on the Top R&B Albums chart for two weeks. It was nominated for Best Rap Album at the 1999 Grammy Awards, but lost to Jay-Z's Vol. 2... Hard Knock Life. It was also the first solo Latin hip hop record to go Platinum.

Reception 

 Entertainment Weekly (7/17/98, p. 85) – "Everything about this Bronx-bred Puerto Rican rapper is generous, his 400-pound girth, his multiple rhyming within each line, and his talent for spewing out verses without stopping for breath." – Rating: B+
 Q (6/00, p. 123) – 4 stars out of 5 – "Displaying huge lyrical prowess and the requisite 'sensitive' side...[the album] established Pun as a serious rival to Biggie Smalls and something of a ladykiller to boot....funk and fun aplenty....Outrageously good."
 The Source (6/98, p. 159) – 4 Mics (out of 5) – "He'll rhyme every possible word in a line because he wants to be twice as nice....Capital Punishments all about execution."
 Rap Pages (9/98, p. 120) – 4 (out of 5) – "Big Pun is at his best with all barrels firing bullets lacing the air like embroidery on grandmama's quilt."

 Legacy 
Rolling Stone included Capital Punishment in their list of The 200 Greatest Hip-Hop Albums of All Time at 128.

 Track listing Sample credits'''
"Intro" samples an dialogue clip from the 1994 film Fresh.
"Beware" samples "Theme for the Losers" by Henry Mancini, "Shook Ones Part I" by Mobb Deep, and interpolates "Hot Potato" by Naughty by Nature.
"Super Lyrical" contains vocal samples from "One More Chance / Stay with Me (Remix)" by The Notorious B.I.G., "It's Logic" by Canibus, and dialogue clips from the 1985 film Rocky IV.
"Still Not a Player" samples "A Little Bit of Love" by Brenda Russell and interpolates "Brazilian Rhyme (Bejio Interlude)" by Earth, Wind & Fire.
"The Dream Shatterer" samples "Funk & Wagner" by Don "Sugarcane" Harris.
"Punish Me" contains a vocal sample from "Not Gonna Be Able to Do It" by Double XX Posse.
"You Ain't a Killer" samples "With a Child's Heart" by Michael Jackson.
"Caribbean Connection" samples "Ready or Not" by Johnny Osbourne, "Moshitup" by Just-Ice, and "It's All About the Benjamins" by Puff Daddy.
"Glamour Life" samples "The World Is a Ghetto" by George Benson.
"I'm Not a Player" samples "Darlin' Darlin' Baby" by The O'Jays, "Singers" by Eddie Murphy, "Darlin', Darlin', Baby (Sweet, Tender, Love)" by Steve Khan.
"Boomerang" samples "Le Bracelet" by Alain Goraguer.
"You Came Up" samples "Don't Ask Me" by Ramon Morris and interpolates "Hail Mary" by 2Pac.
"Tres Leches (Triboro Trilogy)" samples "Las Vegas Tango" by Gary Burton, "The Start of Your Ending (41st Side)" by Mobb Deep, "Method Man" by Wu-Tang Clan, "I Ain't No Joke" by Eric B. & Rakim, and "Guillotine (Swordz)" by Raekwon.
"Parental Disrection" samples "Le Bracelet" by Alain Goraguer.

 Personnel 
Credits for Capital Punishment'' adapted from the album liner notes.

 Armageddon – featured artist
 Denise Barbarita – assistant engineer
 Carlos Bess – mixing
 Big Pun – executive producer, primary artist
 Black Thought – featured artist
 Busta Rhymes – featured artist
 Sean Cane – A&R
 Chris Conway – mixing
 Cuban Link – featured artist
 Dr. Dre – producer
 Dahoud – producer
 Danny O – producer
 dead prez – producer, featured artist
 Domingo – producer
 "E" – mixing
 EQ – producer
 Fat Joe – executive producer, featured artist
 Funkmaster Flex – featured artist
 Paul Gregory – assistant engineer
 Che Harris – A&R coordination
 Daniel "PhotoChop" Hastings
 Troy Hightower – mixing
 Tom Hughes – assistant engineer
 Ken "Duro" Ifil – engineer
 Wyclef Jean – featured artist
 Inspectah Deck – featured artist
 Joe – featured artist
 Ju-Ju – producer
 Jugrnaut – producer
 Knobody – producer
 Ola Kudu – creative direction
 Adam Kudzin – engineer
 L.E.S. – producer
 Matt Life – executive producer
 Laurie Marks – A&R coordination
 Mike D. – A&R
 Minnesota – producer
 Miss Jones – featured artist
 Nastee – engineer
 Frank Nitty – producer
 Nomad – producer
 Prodigy – featured artist
 Prospect – featured artist
 Roc Raida – scratches
 Rockwilder – producer
 RZA – producer
 Schott Free – A&R
 Tony Smalios – engineer, mixing
 Triple Seis – featured artist
 Showbiz – producer
 Soundboy – engineer, mixing
 Kevin Stone – assistant engineer
 Nikos Teneketzis – mixing assistant
 Kieran Walsh – engineer
 Gregory "Gold" Wilson – assistant engineer
 Ted Wohlsen – mixing
 Trauma – producer
 Young Lord – producer
 Leon Zervos – mastering
 Mike Zulu – producer

Album chart positions

Singles

Certifications

See also
List of number-one R&B albums of 1998 (U.S.)

References 

1998 debut albums
Big Pun albums
Loud Records albums
RCA Records albums
Albums produced by Dr. Dre
Albums produced by the Infinite Arkatechz
Albums produced by Domingo (producer)
Albums produced by L.E.S. (record producer)
Albums produced by Showbiz (producer)
Albums produced by Rockwilder